Tom Pendreigh is a Scottish male curler and coach.

At the national level, he is a 2000 Scottish men's champion curler.

Teams

Record as a coach of national teams

Personal life
He is owner of British Curling Supplies.

As of 2018, he was a Chairman of Inverness Ice Centre.

References

External links

Tom Pendreigh High Performance Curling and Wheelchair Curling Coach – Tweed Valley Physiotherapy

Living people
Scottish male curlers
Scottish curling champions
Scottish curling coaches
Year of birth missing (living people)
Place of birth missing (living people)